Reggae artist Burning Spear started his career in 1969 this article contains the discography of the artist's albums and singles.

Albums

Studio albums
Studio One Presents Burning Spear (1973), FAB
Rocking Time (1974), FAB
Marcus Garvey (1975), Island
Garvey's Ghost (1976), Island
Man in the Hills (1976), Island
Dry & Heavy (1977), Island
Social Living (1978), Stop - also released as Marcus' Children 
Living Dub Vol. 1 (1979), Rita Marley Music
Hail H.I.M. (1980), Radic
Living Dub Vol. 2 (1980), Rita Marley Music
Farover (1982), Radic
The Fittest of the Fittest (1983), Radic
Resistance (1985), Heartbeat
People of the World (1986), Greensleeves/Slash
Mistress Music (1988), Greensleeves/Slash
Mek We Dweet (1990), Mango
Jah Kingdom (1991), Mango
The World Should Know (1993), Heartbeat
Rasta Business (1995), Heartbeat
Living Dub Vol. 3 (1996), Declic
Appointment with His Majesty (1997), Heartbeat
Living Dub Vol. 4 (1998), Musidisc
Calling Rastafari (1999), Heartbeat
Free Man (2003), Nocturne
Our Music (2005), Burning
Living Dub Vol. 5 (2006), Collective
Jah Is Real (2008), Burning
Living Dub Vol. 6 (2008), Burning

Live albums
Live (1977), Island
Live in Paris Zenith '88 (1989), Slash
Love & Peace: Burning Spear Live! (1994), Heartbeat
(A)live in Concert 97 (1998), Musidisc
Live at Montreaux Jazz Festival 2001 (2001), Terra Firma
Live in South Africa 2000 (2004), Revolver

Compilations
Harder Than the Best (1979), Island
Reggae Greats: Best of Island years 1975-1978 (1985), Island
100th Anniversary: Marcus Garvey/Garvey's Ghost (1987)
The Fittest Selection: Greatest hits of 1980-1983 (1987), EMI
Keep the Spear Burning (1989), Island
The Original (1992), Sonic Sounds
Chant Down Babylon The Island Anthology (1996), Island
Best of Burning Spear (1999), Declic
Ultimate Collection: Best of Collection (2001), Island
Best of the Fittest: Best of Collection (2001), EMI
Rare and Unreleased (2001)
Spear Burning (2002), Pressure Sounds
20th Century Masters: The Millennium Collection: The Best of Burning Spear: Best of the Island years (2002), IMS
Jah No Dead (2003)
Creation Rebel (2004), Heartbeat
Travelling (2004), Clocktower
Sounds from the Burning Spear (2004), Soul Jazz
Gold (2005)
Rare and Unreleased (2006), Revolver
The Burning Spear Experience (2007), Burning
The Best of Burning Spear (2008), Virgin US
Selection: The Fittest, Sonic Sounds
The Best of Burning Spear: Marcus Garvey (2012), Island

Singles
"We Are Free" (1970), Bamboo - B-side of Irving Brown's "Let's Make It Up"
"Zion Higher" (1971), Banana - B-side of King Cry Cry's "I Had a Talk"
"Live It Out" (1971), Coxsone
"Get Ready", (197?), Coxsone
"Creation Rebel" (197?), Coxsone
"Call on You" (197?), Coxsone
"What a Happy Day" (197?), Coxsone
"Rocking Time" (197?), Coxsone
"Marcus Garvey" (197?), Fox
"Slavery Days" (197?), Fox
"Swell Headed"
"Foggy Road"
"Resting Place" (197?), Fox
"Children of Today", Spear
"The Youth" (197?), Spear
"Old Marcus Garvey" (1976), Island
"I & I Survive" (1976), Island
"The Lion" (1976), Island
"Civilised Reggae"/"Social Living" (1978), Island
"She's Mine" (1982), Radic
"Jah Is My Driver" (1982), Radic - 12-inch
"Marcus Garvey" (1987), Island - 12-inch
"Tell the Children" (1988), Blue Moon
"Great Men" (1990), Mango
"Free the Whole Wide World" (1994), Tribesman
"Never" (2006), Collective
"Education", Burning Spear
"Travelling", Klassic Vinyl

Contributions
"Perfect Day" (1997) - Various Artists charity single in aid of Children in Need

DVD
Home to My Roots (2004), Burning Music/Nocturne
Live in Vermont (2008), Burning Music
Live in Peru (2010)
Rastafari Live (2012), Hudson Street

References
Strong, Martin C. (2002) The Great Rock Discography, Canongate, p. 147-8
Thompson, Dave (2002) Reggae & Caribbean Music, Backbeat Books, p. 51-4, 441, 479

Reggae discographies
Discographies of Jamaican artists